The Grantsville First Ward Meetinghouse, in Grantsville, Utah, United States, is a meeting house of the Church of Jesus Christ of Latter-day Saints (Church) which was built in 1865–1866. It was listed on the National Register of Historic Places in 1982; the listing did not include a 1952 addition to the building.

Description
The church building is located at 297 Clark Street and was a work of Scottish immigrant Hugh Alexander Ross Gillespie.

It is notable as one of few Church meetinghouses built with adobe and having Greek Revival styling that still survive. This one is especially notable for having its vestry attached to the rear rather than to the front of the meetinghouse.

See also

 National Register of Historic Places listings in Tooele County, Utah

References

External links

Churches on the National Register of Historic Places in Utah
Greek Revival church buildings in Utah
Religious buildings and structures completed in 1866
Buildings and structures in Tooele County, Utah
1866 establishments in Utah Territory
National Register of Historic Places in Tooele County, Utah